Faces in the Crowd is a 2011 crime horror film written and directed by Julien Magnat, starring Milla Jovovich, Julian McMahon, David Atrakchi, Michael Shanks, Sandrine Holt, and Sarah Wayne Callies.

Plot
Anna Marchant (Milla Jovovich) witnesses a murder by a serial killer called Tearjerker Jack. Jack chases and attacks her, but she eludes him by falling from a bridge. Anna wakes from a coma one week later and is diagnosed with prosopagnosia, also known as "face blindness". Able to recognize objects but not faces, she works with police detective Sam Kerrest (Julian McMahon) to stop Tearjerker Jack before he can murder her.

Cast

Production
This movie is the second feature of writer/director Julien Magnat. Production began May 8, 2010 in and around Winnipeg, Manitoba, Canada, and principal photography wrapped June 13, 2010.

References

External links
 
 
 

2011 films
2011 horror films
2011 horror thriller films
American horror thriller films
Films shot in Winnipeg
Voltage Pictures films
2010s English-language films
2010s American films